"Didi" is an Arabic raï song written and performed by Algerian singer and musician Khaled, released in 1992. The song was the lead single from the singer's eponymous album Khaled.

"Didi" peaked at number nine in the French Singles Chart and remained on the "Top 50" chart for 20 weeks, making it the first tune sung in Arabic to chart in France. It also topped the singles charts in Switzerland, Belgium, Netherlands, Egypt, and Saudi Arabia. The song also became popular in India.

The music video was directed by Philippe Gautier. The song was one of the opening song for the 2010 FIFA World Cup.

Track listings

CD single
"Didi" (edit version) – 3:20
"Wajabek" (unreleased) – 4:25
"Didi" (Garage mix) – 7:40
"Didi" (Simenon mix) – 6:29

7" single
"Didi" (edit version) – 3:20
"Wajabek" (unreleased) – 4:25

12" single
"Didi" (Simenon mix) – 6:29
"Didi" (Edit version) – 3:20
"Wajabek" (unreleased) – 4:25

Charts

Brahim version

The Moroccan-Belgian singer Brahim released a version of the song with added English language lyrics. The song reached #10 on the Ultratop 50 Belgian Singles Chart in 2005.

Brahim featuring Nessa
In a second release destined for the Moroccan market and the Belgian francophone markets (Wallonia), Brahim added a French language rap section featuring the artist Nessa.

Charts

Milk & Honey cover

The German duo Milk & Honey released an all English language version with completely new lyrics and arrangement. It appeared in the band's 2007 album Elbi and was the second single release from the album after the initial "Habibi (je t'aime)". A separate EP was also released.

Track list 
"Didi" 3:27
"Didi" (instrumental) - 3:29
"Didi" (Algeris club mix) - 3:29
"Didi" (m million mix) - 3:08
"Didi" (tai jason mix) - 4:12

Other versions

Covers

The song was covered in Turkish by Tarkan for his debut album Yine Sensiz (1992) under the title "Kimdi". 

It was also covered in Persian by Andy as "Laili" for his similarly titled album Laili, and in Greek as Giorgos Alkaios's debut single "Ti Ti". 
In 1993 it was also covered in Spanish by Antonio Carbonell.

In the 1990s, it was also covered in Albanian as "Ti më bën xheloz" by the Band Ilirët.

There was also an Urdu version of the song, "Babia" (1993), by Sajjad Ali.

In India, versions of the song became popular through plagiarized versions in local Indian languages. A popular version was the Hindi song "Ladki Ladki" in the Bollywood movie Shreemaan Aashique (1993), arranged by Nadeem-Shravan.

A Serbian copy was released by Dragana Mirkovic as "Baš tebe volim ja" in 1993.

The title was also covered in Russian language by Tatiana Parez in September 2004, who released it as CD maxi.

In 2007 the song was covered by a German girls band Milk & Honey, in an Arab and partial French translation.

In 2022 a Greek version was made by the Greek famous singer Helena Paparizou & Antique named "Ti Ti"

Samples and adaptations
This song was sampled loosely in the 1994 film Brahma by Bappi Lahiri and Kavita Krishnamurthy called Suno Suno Meri Rani Ji.

In 2007 a sample of the song was used in a song of the American singer Amerie in the song titled "Losing U" in her album Because I Love It.

Films
The song was almost completely featured in the 1995 Malayalam movie, Highway, with actress Silk Smitha dancing to the tunes. Just prior to the song, there is a brief part which shows the original song video by Khalid, being played on a television set.

A 2016 Bollywood movie named Airlift covered this song in Hindi as "Dil Cheez Tujhe De Di" sung by Arijit Singh and Ankit Tiwari.

A 2020 Indian movie in Malayalam named Dhamaka covered this song in Malayalam as "Potti Potti" directed by Gopi Sundar

Plagiarism controversies 
In India, there was plagiarism controversy when several Indian musicians plagiarized "Didi" and produced unauthorized cover versions in local Indian languages. A popular version was the Hindi song "Ladki Ladki" in the Bollywood movie Shreemaan Aashique (1993), arranged by Nadeem-Shravan and sung by Sudesh Bhosle and Vinod Rathod.

On April 3, 2015, Khaled was charged for plagiarism of Didi, from Angui ou Selmi, an Algerian rai musical composition recorded by Cheb Rabah (born Rabah Zerradine) in 1988. Cheb Rabah was also compensated by Cheb Mami for plagiarizing his texts. But on May 13, 2016, Court of Cassation removed the charges against Khaled, when a 1982 audio tape with the song was shown. This tape was recorded by Khaled and given to a producer located in Oran, 6 years before Cheb Rabah's record. In the end, Rabah had to compensate Khaled for the fees during this case.

References 

1992 singles
1992 songs
Arabic-language songs
Khaled (musician) songs
Song recordings produced by Don Was
Barclay (record label) singles